Dacryodes macrocarpa is a tree in the family Burseraceae. The specific epithet  is from the Greek meaning "large fruit".

Description
Dacryodes macrocarpa grows as a medium-sized to tall tree. The bark is reddish brown and cracked.

Distribution and habitat
Dacryodes macrocarpa grows naturally in Sumatra, Peninsular Malaysia and Borneo. Its habitat is coastal and swamp forests.

References

macrocarpa
Trees of Sumatra
Trees of Peninsular Malaysia
Trees of Borneo
Plants described in 1932